The 2011 European Speed Skating Championships were held in Collalbo, Italy, from 7 to 9 January 2011.

Men's championships

Day 1

Day 2

1500 metre

Day 3

10000 metre

Allround results 

NQ = Not qualified for the 10000 m (only the best 12 are qualified)
DNS = Did not start

Source: ISU

Women's championships

Day 2

Day 3

Allround results 

NQ = Not qualified for the 5000 m (only the best 12 are qualified)
DNS = Did not start

Source: ISU

Rules 
All participating skaters were allowed to skate the first three distances; 12 skaters may taken part on the fourth distance. These 12 skaters were determined by taking the standings on the longest of the first three distances, as well as the samalog standings after three distances, and comparing these lists as follows:

 Skaters among the top 12 on both lists were qualified.
 To make up a total of 12, skaters were then added in order of their best rank on either list. Samalog standings took precedence over the longest-distance standings in the event of a tie.

See also
 2011 World Allround Speed Skating Championships

References 

European Championships
2011 Allround
European, 2011
Sport in South Tyrol
2011 in Italian sport